Ifrit, also spelled as efreet, afrit, and afreet (Arabic: : , plural), is a powerful type of demon in Islamic mythology. The afarit are often associated with the underworld and identified with the spirits of the dead, and have been compared to evil geniī loci in European culture. In Quran, hadith, and Mi'raj narrations the term is always followed by the phrase among the jinn. In later folklore, they developed into independent entities, identified as powerful demons or spirits of the dead who sometimes inhabit desolate places such as ruins and temples. Their true habitat is the underworld.

Etymology

The word ifrit derives from the Quran, but only as an epithet and not to designate a specific type of demon. The term itself is not found in pre-Islamic Arabic poetry, although variants such as ifriya and ifr are recorded prior to the Quran. It is further used to describe sly, malicious, wicked and cunning characteristics.

Some Western philologists suggest a foreign origin of the word and attribute it to Middle Persian afritan which corresponds to Modern Persian  (to create), but this is regarded as unlikely by others. In folklore, the term developed into a designation of a specific class of demon, though most Islamic scholarly traditions regard the term as an adjective. These popular beliefs were elaborated in works such as in al-Ibshihi's Mustatraf. They became identified either as a dangerous kind of demon (shayatin) preying on women, or as spirits of the dead.

Islamic scriptures

In Islamic scriptures the term ifrit is always followed by the expression of the jinn. Due to the ambiguous meaning of the term jinn, which is applied to a wide range of different spirits, their relation towards the genus of jinn remains vague. However, within the Islamic scriptures themselves, the term is apparently used as an epithet to describe a powerful or malicious spirit of undefined nature.

In the Quran itself, such an ifrit is mentioned in (Q27:38–40). The ifrit offers to carry the throne of Bilqis (the Queen of Sheba) to Solomon: "An ifrit from the jinn said: 'I will bring it to you before you rise from your place. And verily, I am indeed strong, and trustworthy for such work." However, the duty is not given to him, but to somebody who is endowed with knowledge of the scripture. An "ifrit among the jinn" is mentioned in a hadith of Muhammad al-Bukhari, attempting to interrupt the prayers of the prophet Muhammed and in a narrative of Muhammad's night journey recorded in the 8th century by Malik ibn Anas. In the latter account, the "ifrit among the jinn" threatens Muhammad with a fiery presence, whereupon the archangel Gabriel taught Muhammad a Du'a (Islamic prayer) to defeat it. Muslim texts explain, God sent the ifrit on purpose in order that Gabriel might teach Muhammad and his ummah (Muslim community) to overcome their fear of demons at night.

Islamic folklore
In Islamic folklore, the afarit became a class of chthonic spirits, inhabiting the layers of the seven earths, generally ruthless and wicked, formed out of smoke and fire. Nizami Ganjavi describes the ifrit tormenting Mahan, as created from "God's wrath", thus underpinning the ifrit's role secondary to God's will.

But despite their negative depictions and affiliation to the nether regions, afarit are not fundamentally evil on a moral plane; they might even carry out God's purpose. Such obligations can nevertheless be ruthless, such as obligation to blood vengeance and avenging murder. Further, an ifrit can be compelled by a sorcerer, if summoned.

Egypt

Although afarit are not necessarily components of a person, but independent entities, a common belief in Islamic Egypt
associates afarit with part of a human's soul.

Probably influenced by the Ancient Egypt idea of Ka, the afarit are often identified with the spirits of the dead, departing from the body at the moment of death. They live in cemeteries, wander around places the dead person frequently visited, or roam the earth close to the place of death, until the Day of Judgment. A person who died a natural death does not have a malevolent ifrit. Only people who are killed give rise to a dangerous and active ifrit, drawn to the blood of the victim. Driving an unused nail into the blood is supposed to stop their formation. Such afarit might scare and even kill the living or take revenge on the murderer. Martyrs, saints and prophets do not have a ghost, and therefore no ifrit.

Morocco
In Moroccan belief, the afarit form a more powerful type of demon, compared to the jinn and other supernatural creatures. They have more substantial existence, and are greater in scale and capacity than other demons. Their physical appearance is often portrayed as having monstrous deformities, such as claw-like or thorny hands, flaming eyes or seven heads.

Just as with jinn, an ifrit might possess an individual. Such persons gain some abilities from the ifrit, such as getting stronger and more brave, but the ifrit renders them insane. With the aid of a magical ring, the afarit might be forced to perform certain orders, such as carrying heavy stones.

Shabakism
A story circulates among the Shabak community in Northern Iraq about a certain ifrit who incensed Ali by his evil nature long before the creation of Adam. Consequently, for the ifrit's wickedness, Ali chained the ifrit and left him alone. When the prophets arrived, he appeared to all of them and begged them for his release, but no prophet was able to break the chains of the ifrit. When Muhammad found the ifrit, he brought him to Ali. Ali had mercy with the ifrit. He decided to release him under the condition that he surrender to the will of god.

In fiction
Afarit appear already in early poems, such as those of Al-Maʿarri (973–1057), who describes his protagonist visiting a paradise with "narrow straits" and "dark valleys" for afarit, between heaven and hell. In later works, the afarit are mentioned among the narratives collected in One Thousand and One Nights. In one tale called "The Porter and the Young Girls", a prince is attacked by pirates and takes refuge with a woodcutter. The prince finds an underground chamber in the forest leading to a beautiful woman who has been kidnapped by an ifrit. The prince sleeps with the woman and both are attacked by the jealous ifrit, who changes the prince into an ape. Later a princess restores the prince and fights a pitched battle with the ifrit, who changes shape into various animals, fruit, and fire until being reduced to cinders. In "The Fisherman and the Jinni" an ifrit, locked in a jar by the Seal of Solomon, is released but later tricked by the fisherman again into the jar. Under the condition that the ifrit aids him to achieve riches, he releases the ifrit again. The latter ifrit, however, might be substituted by a marid, another type of powerful demon easily tricked by the protagonist. The latter portrayal of an ifrit, as a wish-granting spirit released from a jar, became characteristic of Western depictions of jinn.

Afarit feature frequently in film and video games. In the Final Fantasy video game series, an ifrit appears as a summonable spirit and an enemy. Like its mythological counterpart, it is a spirit of fire and can use an iconic spell called Hell-Fire. In the fifth season of True Blood (2012), an ifrit seeks vengeance for murder of Iraqi civilians by U.S soldiers. In both the novel American Gods (2001) and the television adaptation by Neil Gaiman an ifrit disguised as a taxi-driver appears, trying to get used to his new role, seeking intimacy in a lonely world.

See also

 Archdemon
 Dybbuk
 Genie in popular culture
 Imp
 Oni
 Yūrei
 Zabaniyya

Explanatory notes

References

External links
 

Chthonic beings
Demons in Islam
Ghosts
Jahannam
Jinn